Albert Richard Barnes (2 July 1913 – 8 July 1990) was a Welsh boxer who competed for Great Britain in the 1936 Summer Olympics.

Boxing career
Barnes won the 1934, 1936 and 1937 Amateur Boxing Association British bantamweight titles, when boxing out of the Cardiff City ABC.

At the 1934 British Empire Games in London he won the silver medal in the bantamweight class after losing the final to Eddie Ryan of England. The following year he defeated Petey Scalzo of New York in the New York Golden Gloves tournament during 1935.

In 1936 he was eliminated in the second round of the bantamweight class during the 1936 Olympic Games, after losing his fight to the upcoming bronze medalist Fidel Ortiz of Mexico.

References

External links
Profile

1913 births
1990 deaths
Welsh male boxers
Bantamweight boxers
Olympic boxers of Great Britain
Boxers at the 1936 Summer Olympics
Boxers at the 1934 British Empire Games
Commonwealth Games silver medallists for Wales
Commonwealth Games medallists in boxing
Medallists at the 1934 British Empire Games